Guadua chacoensis is a species of clumping bamboo found in Argentina, Brazil, Bolivia, Paraguay, and Uruguay.

References

External links
 

chacoensis
Grasses of South America
Grasses of Argentina
Grasses of Brazil